The Archos Generation 7 (Gen7) product series is represented by misc "Internet Tablets" or "IT", e.g. the Archos 5 Internet Tablet (sometimes abbreviated as "Archos 5 IT"). This series of tablet computers developed by the French company Archos that features a resistive touchscreen for video, photo, audio, internet browsing and other multimedia applications. The individual numbering of the distinct models seems up to now to roughly resemble the length of the display diagonal in inches.

Archos 5 Internet Tablet 
In September 2009 Archos announced the Archos 5 Internet Tablet 

Being an extension of the Gen6 Archos 5 Internet Media Tablet, this Internet Tablet utilizes Google's Android mobile operating system .

Specification
Processor based on ARM Cortex-A8, 32 bit, dual-issue, superscalar core @ 800 MHz
256 MB of RAM
4.8" display, 800x480 resolution
Video Playback
Music Playback
Storage: 8, 16, 32 or 64 GB Flash memory + Micro SD Slot (SDHC compatible) or 160GB - 500GB with 2.5" hard drive (ext3 file-system)
Built-in GPS
Bluetooth 2.0
FM Radio

References 

Android (operating system) devices
Tablet computers